Wister station is a SEPTA Regional Rail station at Ashmead and Rubicam Streets in the Germantown neighborhood of Philadelphia, Pennsylvania. The station is named after the nearby Wister Street.

The station is in zone 1 on the Chestnut Hill East Line, on former Reading Railroad tracks, and is 6.1 track miles from Suburban Station. In 2013, this station saw 55 boardings and 70 alightings on an average weekday.

Reading Railroad built Wister station in 1932, and it is the last stop inbound on the Chestnut Hill East Line (toward Central Philadelphia) before Wayne Junction Station, where that line merges with the Warminster, West Trenton, Lansdale/Doylestown, and Fox Chase Lines.

Station layout

References

External links
SEPTA - Wister Station
 Station from Google Maps Street View

SEPTA Regional Rail stations
Former Reading Company stations
Wister, Philadelphia
Railway stations in the United States opened in 1932